Slobodan Halilović (born 1 January 1951) is a Bosnian Serb football manager and former player.

Honours

Player
Radnički Niš
Balkan Cup: 1976

Coach
Radnički Niš
Yugoslav Second League: 1985-86
Mogren
Second League of FR Yugoslavia: 1997-98

External links
 Slobodan Halilović website

1951 births
Living people
People from Banovići
Serbs of Bosnia and Herzegovina
Association football fullbacks
Yugoslav footballers
FK Radnički Niš players
Yugoslav First League players
Yugoslav football managers
Serbia and Montenegro football managers
Serbian football managers
FK Radnički Niš managers
Al Wahda FC managers
FK Mogren managers
FK Zeta managers
FK Jedinstvo Bijelo Polje managers
Al Dhafra FC managers
FK Lovćen managers
Yugoslav expatriate football managers
Expatriate football managers in the United Arab Emirates
Yugoslav expatriate sportspeople in the United Arab Emirates
Serbian expatriate football managers
Expatriate football managers in Montenegro
Serbian expatriate sportspeople in Montenegro
Serbian expatriate sportspeople in the United Arab Emirates